HMS Chelmer (K221) was a  of the Royal Navy (RN) from 1943–1957. She served in convoy defence duties in the North Atlantic during World War II. Chelmer was built to the RN's specifications as a Group I River-class frigate, although Chelmer was one of the few powered by a turbine engine.

The River class was a class of 151 frigates launched between 1941 and 1944 for use as anti-submarine convoy escorts and were named for rivers in the United Kingdom. The ships were designed by naval engineer William Reed, of Smith's Dock Company of South Bank-on-Tees, to have the endurance and anti-submarine capabilities of the  sloops, while being quick and cheap to build in civil dockyards using the machinery (e.g. reciprocating steam engines instead of turbines) and construction techniques pioneered in the building of the s. Its purpose was to improve on the convoy escort classes in service with the Royal Navy at the time, including the Flower class.

After commissioning in January 1943, Chelmer participated in anti-submarine warfare exercises off Tobermory, Mull, Larne, and Lough Foyle before being assigned for convoy escort duty in the North Atlantic. In June 1944, Chelmer participated in the Normandy landings.

Chelmer was placed in reserve from 1946. In 1951, she underwent refitting in Leith. In August 1957, she was scrapped at Shipbreaking Industries, Charlestown.

References

External links 
 
 

 

1943 ships
River-class frigates of the Royal Navy
Ships built in Scotland